Conasprella janapatriceae is a species of sea snail, a marine gastropod mollusc in the family Conidae, the cone snails, cone shells or cones.

Distribution
This marine species occurs in the Caribbean Sea off the Cayman Islands.

References

 Petuch E.J., Berschauer D.P. & Poremski A. (2016). Five new species of Jaspidiconus Petuch, 2004 (Conilithidae: Conilithinae) from the Caribbean Molluscan Province. The Festivus. 48(3): 172–178.

janapatriceae
Gastropods described in 2016